Guy of Thouars (died 13 April 1213) was the third husband of Constance, Duchess of Brittany, whom he married in Angers, County of Anjou between August and October 1199 after her son Arthur of Brittany entered Angers to be recognized as count of the three countships of Anjou, Maine and Touraine. He was an Occitan noble, a member of the House of Thouars. He is counted as a duke of Brittany, jure uxoris, from 1199 to 1201.

Between 1196 and the time of her death in 1201, while delivering twin daughters, Constance ruled Brittany with her young son Arthur I, Duke of Brittany as co-ruler. Duke Arthur I was captured in 1202 by their uncle John, King of England and disappeared in 1203; with his full elder sister Eleanor, Fair Maid of Brittany captured along with him and imprisoned by John, he was succeeded by his infant maternal sister, Alix of Thouars. Guy served as Regent of Brittany for his infant daughter Alix from 1203 to 1206.

In 1204, Guy de Thouars as regent of Duchess Alix, vassal of Philip II, King of France, undertook the siege of the Norman island fortress of Mont Saint-Michel. Because the abbey would not surrender, he set fire to the village and massacred the population. He was obliged to beat a retreat under the powerful walls of the abbey. The fire which he himself lit extended to the buildings, and the roofs were engulfed in flames. Philip II paid Abbot Jordan for the reconstruction cost.

In 1206 Philip II took the regency of Brittany himself, much to the consternation of the Breton nobles.

Guy of Thouars died in 1213 in Chemillé in the county of Maine, and was buried with Constance at Villeneuve Abbey, now in the commune of Les Sorinières, outside of Nantes. 'Situated at Nantes south gate, Abbey de Villeneuve' was 'founded in 1201 by Constance de Panthièvre, the Duchess of Brittany ...'

Issue
Guy married Constance of Brittany in 1199. They had two or three daughters:
 Alix of Thouars, succeeded her maternal brother in 1203 as suo jure Duchess of Brittany and Countess of Richmond;
 Catherine of Thouars, Dame of Aubigné; married Andrew III, Baron of Vitré in 1212;
 Margaret of Thouars.

Guy remarried Eustachie of Chemillé in 1203. They had two sons: 
 Peter, Lord of Chemillé (1204-1254/55), who married Eleanor of Porhoët.
 Thomas of Chémillé (d. c. January 1246).

Portrayals in literature 
Guy of Thouars is a secondary character in the novels Le Poids d’une couronne (légende bretonne) (1867-1868) by Gabrielle d’Étampes and A King’s Ransom (2014) by Sharon Kay Penman and is mentioned in the novel Dans l’Ombre du Passé (2020) by Léa Chaillou.

Ancestry

See also
Dukes of Brittany family tree
Viscounts of Thouars

References

Everard, J.A. & Jones, M. Charters of Duchess Constance of Brittany and her Family, The Boydell Press, 1999
Everard, J.A. Brittany and the Angevins, Cambridge University Press, 2000

Footnotes

12th-century births
1213 deaths
12th-century dukes of Brittany
13th-century dukes of Brittany
13th-century viceregal rulers
Regents of Brittany
Year of birth unknown
Jure uxoris officeholders